The Dosadi Experiment is a 1977 science fiction novel by American writer Frank Herbert.  It is the second full-length novel set in the ConSentiency universe established by Herbert in his short stories "A Matter of Traces" and "The Tactful Saboteur", and continued in his novel Whipping Star.  It was first published as a four-part serial in Galaxy Science Fiction magazine from May to August, 1977.

Plot summary
The novel is set in a distant future when humans are part of an interstellar civilization called the ConSentiency composed of many species. One, the Taprisiots, provide instant mind-to-mind communication between two sentient minds anywhere in the universe, and the Caleban provide "jump-doors" (which allow instantaneous travel between any two points in the universe). This is the glue that holds the far-flung ConSentiency together. Unfortunately, one consequence of jump-door technology is the possibility that large numbers of unsuspecting sentients can be diverted to destinations unknown for nefarious purposes. A government saboteur attempts to expose one such plot.

Jorj X. McKie is a Saboteur Extraordinary, one of the principals of the Bureau of Sabotage, and the only human admitted to practice law before the Gowachin bar as a legum (lawyer). While meditating in a park in the Bureau's headquarters, McKie is mentally contacted by the Caleban Fannie Mae, a female member of a multidimensional species of unparalleled power whose visible manifestation in this universe is the star Thyone in the Pleiades cluster.

Generations ago, a secret, unauthorized experiment by the Gowachins was carried out with the help of a contract with the Calebans. They isolated the planet Dosadi behind an impenetrable barrier called "The God Wall". On the planet were placed humans and Gowachin, with an odd mix of modern and old technology.  The planet itself is massively poisonous except for a narrow valley, containing the city "Chu", into which nearly 89 million humans and Gowachin are crowded under terrible conditions.  It is ruled by a dictator, many other forms of government having been tried previously, but without the ability to remove such things as the DemoPol, a computer system used to manipulate populaces without their consent or knowledge. The culture of ordinary day-to-day power in Dosadi is very violent. Among other tools, addictive psychotropes are used for handling power among hierarchies in organisations.

Senior Liator (or Liaitor) Keila Jedrik starts a war that will change Dosadi forever. Jorj travels to Dosadi and escapes with Keila after engaging in ego sharing. This gives them the ability to swap bodies and thus by using a hole in the contract sealing Dosadi they can escape via jump gate. Once free, by legal manoeuvring the Dosadi population is unleashed upon the ConSentiency for good or ill, while the people who set the project in motion try to deal with the consequences, having sent McKie there hoping a solution more in their interest could be found.

Main characters

Jorj X. McKie
Jorj X. McKie is the leading saboteur extraordinary in the Bureau of Sabotage (BuSab), an organization found in The Dosadi Experiment as well as two earlier short stories.  He is described as a squat and ugly man of Pacific Islander ancestry, with green eyes and a shock of red hair.  The Gowachin say they feel their bones age in his presence, because when he smiles, he bears a remarkable resemblance to their "Frog god", the nearly-divine Lawgiver, Mrreg.

A born troublemaker, Jorj McKie finds BuSab to be a natural outlet for his tendencies.  But McKie's success as a BuSab agent is really the result of a formidable intelligence and an exquisite sensitivity to the traditions of other races combined with the ability to adapt to any circumstances.  Sent by the agency to Dosadi as their "best", he was like an infant in swaddling clothes in comparison to a people honed by fifteen generations of violence.  However, in less than a single week Keila Jedrik appraised him as "more Dosadi than Dosadi."

Despite his feelings of genuine love for the Caleban Fannie Mae (a love which is fully returned), McKie finds it difficult to form long-term attachments to human women; he had been married no fewer than fifty occasions by the time of the Dosadi affair.  Nevertheless, he finds in Keila Jedrik a companion who becomes far more than a soul mate.

Keila Jedrik
Keila Jedrik is a human native of Dosadi with short, bristly black hair and icy blue eyes. She introduced a subtle flaw in the computer system governing food distribution, which eliminated her own position as "Senior Liaitor" (or Liator) along with the jobs of 49 other human beings. This small, dislodged pebble became an avalanche that led to a full-scale race-war against the Gowachins who lived side-by-side with humans in the planet's one inhabitable city, a crisis she had long prepared for. Jedrik is the culmination of an eight-generation plan to break free of the God Wall enclosing Dosadi.

When the Bureau of Sabotage got wind of the existence of Dosadi and sent saboteur extraordinary Jorj X. McKie to investigate, Jedrik snatched McKie before he could fall into the hands of Dosadi's nominal ruler Broey. The novel chronicles the way they became utterly joined in body, mind, and purpose.

Broey
Elector Broey is the ruler of the planet Dosadi, the Gowachin Broey is slow to recognize the race riots between human and Gowachin in the warrens of Chu as the beginning of a world war orchestrated by a mid-level functionary in his organization named Keila Jedrik.

After only a few days, Elector Broey is forced to cut his human allies loose and devote all of his resources defending a narrow corridor through Chu to the Rim. Acknowledging the superior abilities of Jedrik, he nevertheless dispatches suicide bombers to make her inevitable victory as costly as possible. But he is shocked into personally surrendering to Jedrik after the God Wall Caleban makes the sky of Dosadi black in preparation for the destruction of the planet.

Temporarily allied with Jedrik, Broey seizes the reins of power throughout the ConSentiency universe after the God Wall contract is cancelled.  He is the only judge to survive the courtarena when the Dosadi affair comes to trial.  In the end, however, he only succeeds in providing a single target for the "ministrations" of the Bureau of Sabotage under its new leader, Jorj X. McKie.

Reception
C. Ben Ostrander reviewed The Dosadi Experiment in The Space Gamer No. 13. Ostrander commented that "The wheels-within-wheels plotting is one of the most enjoyable reading experiences any SF fan can have. I recommend this book highly."

Awards
The Dosadi Experiment was nominated for a Locus Award for best science fiction novel in 1978 but lost to Frederik Pohl's novel Gateway.

References

External links
 
 

1977 American novels
Novels by Frank Herbert
1977 science fiction novels
ConSentiency universe
G. P. Putnam's Sons books
Faster-than-light travel in fiction
Faster-than-light communication